Victor  Lomonosov (7 February 1946 – 29 March 2018) was a Russian-American mathematician known for his work in functional analysis. In operator theory, he is best known for his work in 1973 on the invariant subspace problem, which was described by  Walter Rudin in his classical book on Functional Analysis as "Lomonosov's spectacular invariant subspace theorem".  The Theorem Lomonosov gives a very short proof, using the Schauder fixed point theorem, that if the bounded linear operator T on a Banach space commutes with a non-zero compact operator then T has a non-trivial invariant subspace.   Lomonosov has also published on the Bishop–Phelps theorem and Burnside's Theorem 

Lomonosov received his master's degree from Moscow State University in 1969 and his Ph.D. from National University of Kharkiv in 1974  (adviser Vladimir Matsaev). He  was appointed at the rank of Associate Professor at Kent State University in fall 1991, becoming Professor at the same university in 1999.

References 

1946 births
2018 deaths
Moscow State University alumni
Kent State University alumni
Russian mathematicians
21st-century American mathematicians
20th-century American mathematicians
Kent State University faculty